Phakphokthum is a rural municipality (gaunpalika), one of six  located in Ilam District of Province No. 1 of Nepal. A total of 10 municipalities are found in Ilam, of which 4 are urban and 6 are rural.

It has 7 wards. Phakphok is the municipal headquarters.

History 
Phakphokthum was a village development committee named Phakphok located in the Mechi Zone. Fulfilling the requirement of the new Constitution of Nepal 2015, Ministry of Federal Affairs and Local Development converted all VDCs and Municipalities into 753 new local level bodies. Phakphok turned into a rural municipality as Phakphokthum and the adjoining village development committees added to this. The adjoining VDCs added to this were: Amchok, Phuyatappa, Lumde, Ektappa and Chamaita.

Economy 
The major occupation of the people in this rural municipality is agriculture.

Governance 
Phakphokthum lies in constituency number 2 of Ilam district. Subash Nemwang was elected as a member of parliament in the election of 2017. This is one of the most remote villages of the District.

Transport 
The Damak-Rabi Phagunanda road connects the municipality through shortest way with the southern plains. The span of the highway is about 45 km.

See also
Ilam District

External links
 Official Website
 Final District 1-75 Corrected Last for RAJPATRA

References

Rural municipalities in Koshi Province
Rural municipalities in Ilam District
Rural municipalities of Nepal established in 2017